The Scientific Information Center and Academic Library  (CINiBA) is a joint scientific library of two universities in Katowice - the University of Silesia in Katowice and the University of Economics in Katowice.  It is located in the heart of the university campus, in the center of the Silesian agglomeration.

History 
March 24, 2003 — the two-stage competition of the Association of Polish Architects (SARP) for the creation of the concept of the Scientific Information Center and the Academic Library of the University of Silesia was completed. The winner was a team of architects from Koszalin and Radom.

April 21, 2008 — University of Silesia in Katowice and University of Economics in Katowice formed a consortium.

July 8, 2008 — an agreement was signed between the Silesian Voivodeship and the University of Silesia in Katowice on the co-financing of the Scientific Information Center and Academic Library project within the framework of the Regional Operational Program of the Silesian Voivodeship for 2007-2013. The project leader was the University of Silesia, and the partner was the University of Economics.

August 7, 2009 — signing of a contract for the construction of the Center for Scientific Information and an Academic Library between the University of Silesia, the University of Economics and the general contractor —the consortium "Mostostal Warszawa".

September 27, 2012 — opening of the library for readers.

October 12, 2012 — the official opening of CINiBA.

Library Building 
 Total area: 13 260.49 m2
 Usable area: 12 273.40 m2
 Cubature of the object: 62 560 m3
 Building: 7 floors, 4004 windows
 1000 people can stay in the building at the same time

Mission of the CINiBA 
The Scientific Information Centre and Academic Library provides access to electronic resources in all fields of knowledge. These are full-text, bibliographic and factographic databases.

References

External links
 The Scientific Information Center and Academic Library CINiBA
 

Academic libraries in Poland
University of Silesia in Katowice
Culture in Katowice